John Chalmers, KHC is a minister of the Church of Scotland. From 2010 to 2017, he served as the Principal Clerk to the General Assembly of the Church of Scotland. In 2014, following the withdrawal of Angus Morrison on health grounds, he was nominated to be Moderator of the General Assembly of the Church of Scotland for 2014-15; he was duly formally elected as Moderator on the first day of the General Assembly's week-long annual session. He succeeded Lorna Hood as Moderator. After serving his one-year term, he was succeeded by Angus Morrison. He is a Chaplain in Ordinary to the King - a member of the Ecclesiastical Household in Scotland.

Background
Born in Bothwell, Lanarkshire, John Chalmers studied chemical engineering at the University of Strathclyde before transferring to the University of Glasgow to study divinity. He is married to Liz; they have three children. In 2011, during the General Assembly, his youngest son John-James was severely injured whilst serving with the Royal Marines in Afghanistan. In November 2016 he was awarded an Honorary Degree of Doctor of Divinity by the University of Aberdeen.

Career
His first charge as a parish minister was at Renton Parish Church, Dunbartonshire, followed by Palmerston Place Church in Edinburgh (1986-1995).  Since 1995 he has worked full-time in the Church of Scotland Offices, including as Principal Clerk since 2010.

As Moderator, during the Scottish independence referendum campaign, he called for respectful dialogue  between the proponents and post-referendum he encouraged the church to be an instrument of healing and reconciliation. In February 2015 he met with Pope Francis in Rome. More recently he has continued his interest in mediation and peacemaking and has worked with the Church leaders of South Sudan helping to equip them to participate in local and community peace building.

See also
List of Moderators of the General Assembly of the Church of Scotland

References

External links
The Church of Scotland - official website
Moderator’s page on the Church of Scotland website

Moderators of the General Assembly of the Church of Scotland
20th-century Ministers of the Church of Scotland
Living people
Alumni of the University of Glasgow
Year of birth missing (living people)
21st-century Ministers of the Church of Scotland